Nick may refer to:

 Nick (given name)
 A cricket term for a slight deviation of the ball off the edge of the bat
 British slang for being arrested 
 British slang for a police station
 British slang for stealing
 Short for nickname

Places 
 Nick, Hungary
 Nick, Warmian-Masurian Voivodeship, Poland

Other uses 
 Nick, the Allied codename for Japanese World War II fighter Kawasaki Ki-45
 Nick (DNA), an element of DNA structure
 Nick (German TV channel)
 Nick (novel), a 2021 novel by Michael Farris Smith
 Nick's, a jazz tavern in New York City
 Désirée Nick, a German actress and writer
 Nickelodeon, a children's cable channel

See also

 Nicks, surname
 
 
 NIC (disambiguation)
 Nik (disambiguation)
 'Nique (disambiguation)
 Nix (disambiguation)
 Old Nick (disambiguation)
 Knick (disambiguation)
 Nick Nack (disambiguation)